Charles Dumas (1937–2004) was an American high jumper and Olympic gold medalist.

Charles Dumas may also refer to:
 Charles Dumas (newspaperman) (1851–1935), South Australian newspaper proprietor and politician
 Charles W. F. Dumas (1721–1796), German-born intellectual and American diplomat during the American Revolution
 Charles Robert-Dumas, French author of the novel upon which the 1935 film Second Bureau was based

See also
 Dumas (surname)